Brightwater is a town 20 kilometres southwest of Nelson in Tasman district in the South Island of New Zealand.

Brightwater may also refer to:

 Brightwater, Arkansas, United States
 Brightwater Science and Environmental Centre, a Canadian nature reserve
 Brightwater railway station, a New Zealand railway station that operated between 1876 and 1955
 Brightwater sewage treatment plant in Washington state, USA

See also

 Bright Water
 Brightwaters (disambiguation)